Hans Bellmann (1911–1990) was a Swiss furniture designer primarily active in the 1950s and 1960s. He designed furniture for companies such as Knoll and Horgen-Glarus.

Early career
He completed an apprenticeship as a draftsman and studied from 1931 to 1933 at the Bauhaus in Dessau and Berlin. He subsequently worked as an architect in the studio of Mies van der Rohe. In 1934 he returned to Switzerland and began working as a freelance architect.  By 1946 he had developed a hole series of “Typenmöbel” (type furniture).

Notes

References

Ruegg, Arthur, ed., Wege zur "Guten Form": Neun Beiträge zur Geschichte der Schweizer Produktgestaltung. Basel: Birkhauser, 1 November 1995.
Sembach, Klaus Jurgen, ed., Contemporary Furniture: An International Review of Modern Furniture, 1950 to the Present. New York: Architectural Publishing Book Co., 1982.

External links
 http://www.architonic.com/mus/8101258/1

Swiss furniture designers
Bauhaus alumni
1911 births
1990 deaths